The 2019 Jiffy Lube Alberta Scotties Tournament of Hearts, the provincial women's curling championship for Alberta, was held January 23–27 at the Stettler Recreaction Centre in Stettler, Alberta. The winning Chelsea Carey team went on to win the 2019 Scotties Tournament of Hearts in Sydney, Nova Scotia.

Qualification

Teams
The teams are listed as follows:

Knockout brackets

A Event

B Event

C Event

Playoffs

A vs B
Saturday, January 26, 18:30

C1 vs C2
Saturday, January 26, 18:30

Semifinal
Sunday, January 27, 11:00

Final
Sunday, January 27, 17:00

References

External links

2019 in Alberta
Curling in Alberta
Stettler, Alberta
2019 Scotties Tournament of Hearts
January 2019 sports events in Canada